McVille is an unincorporated community in South Buffalo Township, Armstrong County, Pennsylvania, United States.

History
The McVille post office was established on May 5, 1864, with Robert McCaslin as postmaster. It remained in operation until 1903. That same year, 1864, John Boyd opened a store about 190 yards northwest of the steam mill then located on the west side of Nicholson's run. The first and only resident clergyman at McVille in 1883 was Rev. Jacob F. Dean, Baptist, who settled there in 1868.

McVill P.O. appears in the 1876 Atlas of Armstrong County, Pennsylvania.

References

Unincorporated communities in Armstrong County, Pennsylvania
Unincorporated communities in Pennsylvania